Atlanta Datagraphic was an amateur U.S. soccer club sponsored by the Datagraphic firm of Atlanta, Georgia.  It won the 1979 National Amateur Cup.

History
In 1979, George D. Baker, president of Datagraphic, a printing firm located in Atlanta, Georgia, founded a men’s amateur soccer team.  The team rapidly proved itself as one nation’s top amateur clubs as it took the 1979 National Amateur Cup.  Over the years, the club expanded to include youth, women’s and over-30 teams.  By the mid-1980s, the club had over thirty teams.  In 1986, the senior team was coached by David Chadwick.  In 1992, it fielded a semi-professional club, the Atlanta Datagraphic Magic in the USISL.  Datagraphic played in the Atlanta District Amateur Soccer League during the 1980s.

Coaches
 Tim Hankinson 1984
 David Chadwick 1986
 John Staniforth 1991
 Daniel "Danny" Hay 1982

Honors
National Amateur Cup
 Winner (1) – 1979
 Runner Up (2) – 1980, 1987
 3rd in nation Under 19 – 1982

References

Atlanta Silverbacks
Soccer clubs in Atlanta
Defunct soccer clubs in Georgia (U.S. state)
Association football clubs established in 1979
1979 establishments in Georgia (U.S. state)